André Gabriel Edmée Pirro (12 February 1869 – 11 November 1943) was a French musicologist and an organist.

Born in Saint-Dizier, Pirro learned to play the organ from his father Jean Pirro. In Paris where he became and organist and a choirmaster for the Collège Stanislas de Paris. He studied with César Franck and taught music history at the Schola Cantorum. Pirro published his academic thesis on the Aesthetics of Bach in 1907, followed by Descartes and the Music'''. His famous pupils include Yvonne Rokseth, Vladimir Fedorov, Dragan Plamenac, Armand Machabey, Geneviève Thibault de Chambure, Marc Pincherle, Jacques Chailley, Eugénie Droz, and Aimee Wiele.  These days he is probably most often remembered through his musicological collaborations with Alexandre Guilmant concerning reprints of ancient organ music.

Publications
 L'Esthétique de Jean-Sébastien Bach (Paris, 1907), English translation by Joe Armstrong The Aesthetic of Johann Sebastian Bach (Lanham, MD, 2014), 
 L'orgue de Jean-Sébastien Bach (Paris, 1895),
 Jean-Sébastien Bach (Paris, 1906), English translation by Mervyn Savill J. S. Bach (New York, 1957),
 Descartes et la musique (Paris, 1907)
 Dietrich Buxtehude (Paris, 1911),
 Schütz (Paris, 1913),
 Jean-Sébastien Bach, auteur comique (Madrid, 1915),
 Les Clavecinistes : étude critique (Paris, 1924),
 La Musique à Paris sous le règne de Charles VI, 1380-1422 (Strasbourg, 1930),
 La Musique française du Moyen Âge à la Révolution (Paris, 1940),
 Histoire de la Musique de la fin du XI siècle à la fin du XVI (Paris, 1940),
 numerous articles in French and other journals,
 14 biographical notes for the Archives des maîtres de l'orgue (Paris, 1897–1909).

References
 Romain Rolland, « Hommage à André Pirro », Information musicale, no. spécial, 3 Dec. 1943
 Y. Rossens, « André Pirro », Revue de musicologie, no. XXVI, 1944
 N. Bedgman, « André Pirro », Revue de l'enseignement supérieur'', no. 2, 1956

20th-century French musicologists
French classical organists
French male organists
Pupils of César Franck
Pupils of Charles-Marie Widor
Academic staff of the Schola Cantorum de Paris
French people of Italian descent
People from Saint-Dizier
1869 births
1943 deaths
Male classical organists